Dandougou may refer to:

Burkina Faso
Dandougou, Mangodara
Dandougou, Sidéradougou

Ivory Coast
Dandougou, Ivory Coast

Mali
Dandougou, Mali